J.J. Madan was a theater business owner and film director in India. He was the third son of Indian film magnate Jamshedji Framji Madan who started Madan Theatres Ltd. in 1919. After his father died in 1923, J. J. Madan took over the management of Madan Theatres.

Indian-American actor Erick Avari is a great-great-grandson of J. F. Madan (and great-grandson of J. J. Madan).

Filmography
 The 1922 silent film version of the Savitri and Satyavan story, an Italian co-production directed by Giorgio Mannini and J. J. Madan produced by Madan Theatres Ltd and Cines.
 Laila Majnu (1927 silent film)
 Shirin Farhad (1931 film)
 Zalim Saudagar (1941)

References

Indian theatre managers and producers
20th-century Indian businesspeople
20th-century Indian film directors
Indian silent film directors
Indian silent film producers